In mathematics and information theory, Sanov's theorem gives a bound on the probability of observing an atypical sequence of samples from a given probability distribution. In the language of large deviations theory, Sanov's theorem identifies the rate function for large deviations of the empirical measure of a sequence of i.i.d. random variables. 

Let A be a set of probability distributions over an alphabet X, and let q be an arbitrary distribution over X (where q may or may not be in A).  Suppose we draw n i.i.d. samples from q, represented by the vector .  Then, we have the following bound on the probability that the empirical measure  of the samples falls within the set A:

,

where
  is the information projection of q onto A.

In words, the probability of drawing an atypical distribution is bounded by a function of the KL divergence from the true distribution to the atypical one; in the case that we consider a set of possible atypical distributions, there is a dominant atypical distribution, given by the information projection.

Furthermore, if A is the closure of its interior,

References

Sanov, I. N. (1957) "On the probability of large deviations of random variables". Mat. Sbornik 42(84), No. 1, 11–44.
Санов, И. Н. (1957) "О вероятности больших отклонений случайных величин". ''МАТЕМАТИЧЕСКИЙ СБОРНИК' 42(84), No. 1, 11–44.

Information theory
Probabilistic inequalities